"Caught in the Middle" is a song recorded by American singer-songwriter Anastacia, released on July 28, 2017. The song served as the lead single for her seventh studio album Evolution (2017). Written by Anders Bagge, Lauren Dyson, Javier Gonzalez and Ninos Hanna and produced by Bagge.

Music video
The music video was filmed on 20–21 June 2017, and directed by Peter Svenson. The music video was released to Anastacia's VEVO on August 4, 2017.

Track listings and formats
Digital Download

"Caught in the Middle" – 2:55

Charts

Release history

References

2017 songs
2017 singles
Anastacia songs
Polydor Records singles
Universal Records singles
Songs written by Anders Bagge
Songs written by Lauren Dyson